As It Is In Life is a 1910 silent short film directed by D. W. Griffith and produced and distributed by the Biograph Company. Mary Pickford appears in the film.

The film is preserved from Library of Congress paper prints.

Plot
The film starts out with an intertitle stating, ‘The Mother is Gone’. The father, named George Forrester, works at a pigeon farm. The daughter is very lonely when her dad leaves for work, so George brings his daughter to his work at the farm. George meets an old sweetheart, and they rekindle. Forrester lets the woman go for his daughter, because he can’t support a wife and child. Years pass and the daughter is all grown up. She tells her dad that she will never leave him. Forrester and his daughter go for a walk along the beach and the farm where he works. A young man catches the eye of the daughter. Forrester tells his daughter that she must choose between him and the young man. She ends up choosing the young man and they get married. George is bitter and doesn’t go to the wedding or visit the couple. The daughter and the young man have a child and she brings it to her father in hopes he will notice. The father is delighted to see the child and he and his daughter reunite.

Cast
George Nichols - George Forrester
Gladys Egan - George Forrester's Daughter as a young girl
Mary Pickford - George Forrester's Daughter as a young woman
Marion Leonard - George Forrester's Sweetheart
Charles West - George Forrester's Son-in-Law

other cast
Kate Bruce - The Maid
William J. Butler -
W. Chrystie Miller - Man
Anthony O'Sullivan - Farm Worker
Frank Opperman - Companion of Daughter's Husband
Mack Sennett - Owner of a Pigeon Farm (unconfirmed)

Production
As It Is In Life production took place on February 22, 1910 and it was filmed at a pigeon farm in Edendale, CA which was the same place another Griffith film, A Rich Revenge was filmed at.

See also
 List of American films of 1910

References

External links
As It Is In Life at IMDb.com

 As It Is In Life available for free download at Internet Archive

1910 films
Silent American drama films
American silent short films
American black-and-white films
Biograph Company films
Films directed by D. W. Griffith
1910 short films
1910 drama films
1910s American films
American drama short films
1910s English-language films